Musala Glacier on Greenwich Island in the South Shetland Islands, Antarctica is situated northeast of Targovishte Glacier, east-northeast of Zheravna Glacier and southeast of Fuerza Aérea Glacier.

The glacier is named after Musala Peak in the Rila Mountain, the summit of Bulgaria and the Balkan Peninsula.

Location
Bulgarian mapping in 2005 and 2009.

See also
 List of glaciers in the Antarctic
 Glaciology

Maps
 L.L. Ivanov et al. Antarctica: Livingston Island and Greenwich Island, South Shetland Islands. Scale 1:100000 topographic map. Sofia: Antarctic Place-names Commission of Bulgaria, 2005.
 L.L. Ivanov. Antarctica: Livingston Island and Greenwich, Robert, Snow and Smith Islands. Scale 1:120000 topographic map.  Troyan: Manfred Wörner Foundation, 2009.  
 Antarctic Digital Database (ADD). Scale 1:250000 topographic map of Antarctica. Scientific Committee on Antarctic Research (SCAR). Since 1993, regularly upgraded and updated.
 L.L. Ivanov. Antarctica: Livingston Island and Smith Island. Scale 1:100000 topographic map. Manfred Wörner Foundation, 2017.

References
 Musala Glacier. SCAR Composite Antarctic Gazetteer
 Bulgarian Antarctic Gazetteer. Antarctic Place-names Commission. (details in Bulgarian, basic data in English)

External links
 Musala Glacier. Copernix satellite image

Glaciers of Greenwich Island